Diva: The Video Collection is a video longform. When Sarah Brightman introduces each song, she talks about where, when and how the music video was made. Several music videos are not featured, most notable songs are Rhythm of the Rain, Deliver Me and All I Ask of You.

Track listing

Certifications

References

Concert films
Sarah Brightman albums
Live video albums
2006 video albums